The 2010–11 season was Valencia Club de Fútbol's 93rd in existence and the club's 24th consecutive season in the top flight of Spanish football. The season was the third season of Unai Emery in front of the team.

Current squad
The numbers are established according to the official website: www.valenciacf.comThe following players are registered with the B team but are able to take part in First team matches.''

Out on loan

Players in / out

In 

Total spending:  €33,250,000

Out 

Total income:   €87,500,000

Squad statistics

Squad stats

Disciplinary records

Club

Coaching staff

Last updated: 25 May 2011Source: Valenciacf.es

Pre-season and friendlies

Competitions

Overall
Valencia is going to be present in all major competitions: La Liga, the UEFA Champions League and the Copa del Rey.

La Liga

League table

Results summary

Results by round

Matches

Copa del Rey

Round of 32

Round of 16

UEFA Champions League

Group stage

Knockout phase

Round of 16

References

External links 
  

Spanish football clubs 2010–11 season
2010-11
2010–11 UEFA Champions League participants seasons